Amara lunicollis is a species of seed-eating ground beetle in the family Carabidae. It is found in Europe and Northern Asia (excluding China), North America, and temperate Asia.

References

Further reading

External links

 

lunicollis
Articles created by Qbugbot
Beetles described in 1837